Edgar Alfred Morling (April 21, 1864 – October 15, 1932) was a justice of the Iowa Supreme Court from October 1, 1925, to October 15, 1932, appointed from Palo Alto County, Iowa.

References

Justices of the Iowa Supreme Court
1864 births
1932 deaths